Meggittia maungmagana is a species of predatory sea snail, a marine gastropod in the family Pseudomelatomidae, the turrids and allies.

Distribution
This marine species occurs off Maungmagan, Lower Myanmar.

References

 Ray, Harish Chandra. "Contribution to the knowledge of the molluscan fauna of Maungmagan, Lower Burma." (1977)

External links
 

maungmagana